Colombia competed at the 1988 Summer Paralympics in Seoul, South Korea. 17 competitors from Colombia won no medals and so did not place in the medal table.

See also 
 Colombia at the Paralympics
 Colombia at the 1988 Summer Olympics

References 

Nations at the 1988 Summer Paralympics
1988
Summer Paralympics